Grover is a masculine given name.

Origin
Grover first became popular as a given name in the United States during the presidencies of Grover Cleveland, in part of a long-standing American trend of naming babies after presidents. Cleveland's official given name was Stephen; he was named after Stephen Grover, a former minister at the church his parents attended. However, from childhood, Cleveland's friends addressed him by his middle name instead, and so what was originally the surname Grover became a given name. According to Social Security Administration data, the given name Grover increased in frequency by 850 per 100,000 births in the United States between November 1883 and November 1884 (the month when Cleveland won his first presidential election), and spiked again after he won the 1892 election. It later declined in popularity, and was last one of the top one thousand given names in the United States in the 1970s. One notable modern usage is for Grover the Muppet on the television show Sesame Street.

People

Government and politics
 Grover Cleveland (1837–1908), 22nd and 24th President of the United States
 Grover M. Moscowitz (1886–1947), judge on the US District Court for the Eastern District of New York
 Grover Ramstack (1886–1948), member of the Wisconsin State Assembly
 Grover Whalen (1886–1962), commissioner of the New York City Police
 Grover C. Winn (1886–1943), speaker of the Alaska House of Representatives
 Grover C. Dillman (1889–1979), Michigan State Highway Commissioner
 Grover L. Broadfoot (1892–1962), chief justice of the Wisconsin Supreme Court
 Grover A. Giles (1892–1974), attorney-general of Utah
 Grover Sellers (1892–1980), attorney-general of Texas
 Grover C. George (1893-1976), American farmer and politician
 Grover C. Richman Jr. (1911–1983), attorney-general of New Jersey
 Grover Norquist (born 1956), founder of Americans for Tax Reform

Sports
 Grover Land (1884–1958), American baseball catcher
 Grover Fuller (1885–1928), American jockey 
 Grover Lowdermilk (1885–1968), American baseball pitcher
 Grover Cleveland Alexander (1887–1950), American baseball pitcher
 Grover Baichley (1888–1956), American baseball pitcher
 Grover Gilmore (baseball) (1888–1919), American baseball right fielder
 Grover Hartley (1888–1964), American baseball catcher
 Grover Washabaugh (1892–1973), American basketball coach
 Grover Malone (1895–1950), American National Football League player
 Grover Seitz (1907–1957), American Minor League Baseball player
 Grover Resinger (1916–1986), American baseball coach
 Grover Froese (1916–1982), American baseball umpire
 Grover Klemmer (1921–2015), American sprinter and National Football League referee
 Grover Nutt (1921–2012), American college football coach
 Bud Delp (Grover Greer Delp; 1932–2006), American racehorse trainer
 Grover Powell (1940–1985), American baseball pitcher
 Raz Reid (Grover Reid; born 1950), American tennis player
 Grover Covington (born 1956), Canadian Football League defensive end 
 Grover Wiley (born 1974), American middleweight boxer
 Grover Gibson (born 1978), American association football midfielder in Germany's 2. Bundesliga
 Grover Harmon (born 1989), Cook Islands association football midfielder
 Grover Stewart (born 1993), American National Football League nose tackle

Scholars
 Grover Simcox (1867–1966), American naturalist illustrator
 Grover Powers (1887–1968), American physician, director of the Yale University Department of Pediatrics
 Grover E. Murray (1916–2003), American geologist
 Grover C. Stephens (1925–2003), American marine biologist
 Grover Krantz (1931–2002), American anthropologist and cryptozoologist
 Grover Hutchins (1933–2010), American pathologist
 Grover Furr (born 1944), American professor of medieval English literature
 Grover C. Gilmore (born 1950), American psychologist
 Grover Whitehurst, American education researcher

Other
 Grover S. Wormer (1821–1904), Union Army general during the US Civil War
 G. C. Brewer (Grover Cleveland Brewer; 1884–1956), American Christian leader
 Grover C. Womack (1885–1956), American businessman in Louisiana
 Grover C. Hall (1888–1941), American newspaper editor in Alabama
 Grover Loening (1888–1976), American aviation pioneer and aircraft designer
 Grover Clark (1891–1938), American journalist in China and Japan
 Grover Clinton Tyler (1892–1966), American aeronautical pioneer and US Postal Service airmail pilot
 Grover Cleveland Bergdoll (1893–1966), American heir and World War I draft dodger
 Grover Jones (1893–1940), American actor
 Grover C. Nash (1911–1970), American pilot, first black man to fly for the US Postal Service
 Grover Mitchell (1930–2003), American jazz trombonist
 Grover Lewis (1934–1995), American journalist, pioneer of New Journalism
 Grover Dale (born 1935), American actor
 Grover Washington, Jr. (1943–1999), American jazz saxophonist
 Grover Jackson (born 1949), American luthier
 Grover Gardner (born 1956), American narrator of audio books

Fictional characters
 Grover Underwood (Percy Jackson), from the 2000s American book series Percy Jackson and the Olympians
 Grover, Sesame Street character

References

English masculine given names
English-language masculine given names
Given names originating from a surname